Concord Point Light is a  lighthouse in Havre de Grace, Maryland. It overlooks the point where Susquehanna River flows into the Chesapeake Bay, an area of increasing navigational traffic when it was constructed in 1827. It is the northernmost lighthouse and the second-oldest tower lighthouse still standing on the bay. 

Concord Point Light is currently listed as a private aid to navigation.

Description
Concord Point Light is among the many Maryland lighthouses built by John Donahoo, who also built its keeper's house across the street. The tower is constructed of Port Deposit granite.

The lantern was originally lit with nine whale oil lamps with  tin reflectors. In 1854, a sixth-order Fresnel lens was installed. This was later upgraded to a fifth-order Fresnel lens. 

The lighthouse was automated in 1920.

History
Among the lighthouse's keepers from 1827 to the mid-1900s were several members of the O'Neill family. The first O'Neill, John O'Neill had defended the town of Havre de Grace by manning a cannon battery on Concord Point during the War of 1812. 

By 1924, local documents describe the lighthouse area as being "seriously blighted"; it apparently remained that way for many years. 

The lighthouse was decommissioned by the Coast Guard in 1975; soon after that, the lens was stolen. The structure was added to the National Register of Historic Places in 1976. Extensive restoration work began in 1979. The keeper's house has since been restored and is open to the public as a museum. 

In 1983, a fifth-order Fresnel lens borrowed from the Coast Guard was installed in the lantern room.

See also

 National Register of Historic Places listings in Harford County, Maryland 
 Lighthouses in Maryland
 Lighthouses in the United States

References

External links

 Concord Point Lighthouse - official site
Lighthouse Friends: Concord Point Light - photos and description
Chesapeake Chapter U.S. Lighthouse Society - description and driving directions
Trip report to Concord Point Light
Chesapeake Bay Lighthouse Project - Concord Point Light
, including photo dated 1990, at Maryland Historical Trust

Lighthouses completed in 1827
Lighthouses on the National Register of Historic Places in Maryland
Museums in Harford County, Maryland
Lighthouse museums in Maryland
Transportation buildings and structures in Harford County, Maryland
Buildings and structures in Havre de Grace, Maryland
National Register of Historic Places in Harford County, Maryland
1827 establishments in Maryland